The 2013 UCI Cyclo-cross World Championships was the World Championship for cyclo-cross. It took place at Eva Bandman Park in Louisville, Kentucky, USA on Saturday, February 2, 2013. It was the first ever cyclo-cross world championship held outside of Europe. As in past years, four events were held. These world championships were mostly dominated by Belgium and Netherlands who, combined, won nine of the twelve possible medals and all of the gold medals.

Schedule

The original schedule was set to hold four events spread out over two days. Due to rising water levels in the Ohio River and Beargrass Creek, which were predicted to flood low-lying parts of the venue by the morning of February 3, the UCI decided on Friday, February 1 to hold all the races on Saturday, February 2.

The event organizers arranged for a temporary barrier to be erected to keep floodwaters from reaching the course on Saturday. In addition, the rider presentation, scheduled for the evening of February 1 at the Fourth Street Live! entertainment complex in downtown Louisville, was canceled. As a result of the schedule change, all four newly crowned world champions were able to attend the Louisville Foam Party. 

 Saturday February 2, 2013
 9:45/14:45 Men's Juniors
 11:00/16:00 Women's Elite
 12:30/17:30 Men's Under 23
 14:30/19:30 Men's Elite

All times in Eastern Standard Time, followed by UTC.

Original

 Saturday February 2, 2013
 11:00/16:00 Men's Juniors
 14:30/19:30 Men's Under 23
 Sunday February 3, 2013
 11:00/16:00 Women's Elite
 14:30/19:30 Men's Elite

All times in Eastern Standard Time, followed by UTC.

Medal table

Medal summary

References

External links

 Official website

 
Uci Cyclo-cross World Championships, 2013
UCI Cyclo-cross World Championships
International cycle races hosted by the United States
Sports competitions in Louisville, Kentucky
2013 in American sports
UCI Cyclo
February 2013 sports events in the United States